Neolasioptera boehmeriae is a species of gall midges, insects in the family Cecidomyiidae. It is found in the northeastern United States and Southern Canada. False nettles (genus Boehmeria) are host plants of Neolasioptera boehmeriae.

References

Further reading

 
 

Cecidomyiinae
Articles created by Qbugbot
Insects described in 1908